Lepyokhinka is a rural locality (a settlement) in Ternovskoye Rural Settlement, Novokhopyorsky District, Voronezh Oblast, Russia. The population was 74 as of 2010. There are 3 streets.

Geography 
Lepyokhinka is located 58 km southwest of Novokhopyorsk (the district's administrative centre) by road. Dolinovsky is the nearest rural locality.

References 

Populated places in Novokhopyorsky District